Ana Gabriela Lozada Salas (born 22 July 1997) is a Mexican footballer who plays as a centre back for Liga MX Femenil side Cruz Azul and the Mexico women's national team.

International career
Lozada made her senior debut for Mexico on 11 March 2020 in a 0–0 friendly draw against the Czech Republic.

References

External links 
 

1997 births
Living people
Women's association football central defenders
Mexican women's footballers
Footballers from Mexico City
Mexico women's international footballers
Liga MX Femenil players
Club América (women) footballers
21st-century Mexican women
20th-century Mexican women
Mexican footballers